New Love For Old is a 1918 American silent drama film directed by Elsie Jane Wilson from the story by  Waldemar Young. The film stars Ella Hall, Winter Hall and Emory Johnson. The film was released on February 18, 1918, by  Universal

Plot

Cast

References

External links

 
 

American silent feature films
American black-and-white films
Silent American drama films
Films directed by Elsie Jane Wilson
1910s American films
1910s English-language films